Zell unter Aichelberg is a municipality in the district of Göppingen in Baden-Württemberg in southern Germany.

Geographical location
Between Stuttgart and Ulm, on the western edge of the district Göppingen, lies the municipality of Zell unter Aichelberg close to the Swabian Jura surrounded by the still numerous existing orchards.

Neighboring communities
The neighboring municipalities are: Hattenhofen, Göppingen-Bezgenriet, Bad Boll, Aichelberg, Ohmden and Holzmaden. (Number 1-4 district of Göppingen, Holzmaden and Ohmden district of Esslingen)

Geology
Fossils from the Black Jurassic Jura can be seen in the Urweltmuseum in Holzmaden. The community is part of the 1979 excavation formed reserve fossils Holzmaden.
North of the partial local Pliensbach flows the eponymous Pliensbach which joins the Butzbach. This flows in Uhingen in the Fils. Other, smaller watercourses, are the Giesbach and the Zellerbach.

The Pliensbachian age of the Early Jurassic is named after the hamlet of Pliensbach in the municipality.

Municipality arrangement
The municipality consists of the village Zell unter Aichelberg, the hamlet Pliensbach and the homestead Erlenwasen.

Space division
639 ha total area
67 ha = 10.5% forest area
397 ha = 62.1% farm land area
6 ha = 1.0% water area
5 ha = 0.8% recreation area
103 ha = 16.1% building area
56 ha = 8.8% transportation area
4 ha = 0.6% other area

According to data from Statistical office Baden-Württemberg, 2014.

History
1108: First mention of the place as Castellum Cella (controversial). Other sources mention as first mention the entry map of Cella near Kirchheim in a gift book from 1140 from the Reichenbach Priory (Baden-Württemberg) in the Black Forest.
1466 Zell falls to Göppingen and so became temporarily in the possession of the Dukes of Bavaria.
1475: Zell belongs to Württemberg again.
September 1519: In the conflicts between Ulrich, Duke of Württemberg and the Swabian League, the place was heavily affected. Troops of the Swabian League devastated 57 buildings in Zell 57 and 14 in Pliensbach. 
1628: The plague reaches Zell
1810: Reorganization: Zell is allocated to Oberamt Kirchheim.
July 1878: Separation of Aichelberg
April 1, 1933: Eckwälden is separated and combined with the municipality Boll.
1938: Zell falls to the administrative district Göppingen.
2008: Zell celebrates its 900 anniversary.

Religions

Around two-thirds of the population  are evangelical, about one third is Catholic.

Population
The population 1837-2010:
Date	Population
1837	721
1907	970
May 17, 1939	661
September 13, 1950	1,007
May 27, 1970	1,434
December 31, 1983	2,176
December 31, 2005	2,973
December 31, 2010	3,028

Mayor
1938–1945: C.E. Hoyler
1945–1948: Various Temporary Administrators
1948–1955: P. H. Flechtner
1955–1987: Gerhard Schwegler
1987–2019: Werner Link
since 2019: Christopher Flink

Crest
The blazon of the municipal coat of arms of Zell unter Aichelberg is: Under golden, with a horizontal black deer rack occupied shield main in red an armored golden left-arm.
Emblem and flag were presented on February 19, 1959, by the Stuttgart Ministry of the Interior. The flag colors of the place are yellow-red.

Partnership
Since 1997, there is a partnership with the municipality Friedersdorf from Saxony-Anhalt.

Economy and infrastructure
Facilities such as the community hall, the fire station, the primary and secondary school and the cemetery are centrally located.

Transportation
To the local road network the municipality is connected by street 1214/1215 and the Kreisstraße 1421. The Autobahn exit Aichelberg at the Bundesautobahn 8 is 3 km from the municipality center.

Established businesses
The Margarete Ostheimer company manufactures handmade wooden figures and animals that are sold worldwide.

Education
The primary and secondary school Zell unter Aichelberg has around 300 students and 20 teachers.

Buildings

In the center is the Martin church with frescoes dating back to 1400. The namesake of the church is Martin of Tours. The present church is in its essential parts from the year 1386. 
By numerous efforts of the municipality and the population, Zell achieved 1994 the first place in the competition Our village is beautiful. A therefrom arisen Landmark is the Schäferbrunnen located in the town center opposite the town hall.

In the town hall there is a permanent exhibition of paintings of the painter Margret Hofheinz-Döring, who lived in Zell from 1974 to 1993.

Natural monuments
Southwest of the municipality is located parallel to the country road L1214 a perry pears trail. The 500 m long path was built in the years 1998 to 2003, and shows various most pear varieties.

Sports
The TSG Zell - founded in 1949 - is the biggest club with about 600 members and includes the departments singing, gymnastics, fistball, chess and football.
The table tennis club Zell unter Aichelberg (TTV Zell) has some 180 members.

Regular events
The most important festivals include the in the district Pliensbach held Fischerfest and the in July held fountain party. The each November held Remember our Youth Festival, an indoor rock festival with regularly over 600 visitors and performances by international bands and artists.

People from the town
 Leonhard Dürr (died 1538 in Roggenburg), abbot in Adelberg monastery.
 Friedrich Benjamin Osiander (1759-1822), physician, pioneer in the field of surgical obstetrics.

Personalities who have worked locally
 Margret Hofheinz-Döring, (1910-1994), painter and artist, lived from 1974 to 1993 in Zell unter Aichelberg. She was honored in 1990 by planting a lime tree.

Literature
 Theiss, Konrad: Der Kreis Göppingen. Konrad Theiss Verlag, Stuttgart 1978, .
 Binder, Adolf: Geschichte und Geschichten aus Zell am Aichelberg. 1985

References 

Göppingen (district)
Municipalities in Baden-Württemberg